In enzymology, a serine—tRNA ligase is an enzyme that catalyzes the chemical reaction

ATP + L-serine + tRNASer  AMP + diphosphate + L-seryl-tRNASer

The 3 substrates of this enzyme are ATP, L-serine, and tRNA(Ser), whereas its 3 products are AMP, diphosphate, and L-seryl-tRNA(Ser).

This enzyme belongs to the family of ligases, to be specific those forming carbon-oxygen bonds in aminoacyl-tRNA and related compounds.  The systematic name of this enzyme class is L-serine:tRNASer ligase (AMP-forming). Other names in common use include seryl-tRNA synthetase, SerRS, seryl-transfer ribonucleate synthetase, seryl-transfer RNA synthetase, seryl-transfer ribonucleic acid synthetase, and serine translase.  This enzyme participates in glycine, serine and threonine metabolism and aminoacyl-trna biosynthesis.

Structural studies

References

 
 
 
 

EC 6.1.1
Enzymes of known structure